Gaus Electronics is a 2022 South Korean television series starring Kwak Dong-yeon, Ko Sung-hee, Bae Hyun-sung and Kang Min-ah. It is based on a webtoon of the same title by writer Kwak Baek-soo, which was released on Naver. The series is an original drama of Olleh TV, and is available for streaming on its platform and on OTT media service Seezn. It also aired on ENA's Fridays and Saturdays at 21:00 (KST) time slot, from  September 30 to November 5, 2022.

Synopsis
The series is about the office workers of Marketing Team 3 at the home appliance headquarters of Gaus Electronics—a multinational company. It highlights the highs and lows of corporate life, and love and friendship between the employees.

Cast

Main
 Kwak Dong-yeon as Lee Sang-sik
 Ko Sung-hee as Cha Na-rae
 Bae Hyun-sung as Baek Ma-tan
 Kang Min-ah as Geon Kang-mi

Supporting
 Baek Hyun-jin as Ki Sung-nam
 Heo Jung-do as Wi Jang-byung
 Jeon Seok-chan as Cha Wa-wa
 Go Woo-ri as Sung Hyeong-mi
 Baek Soo-jang as Kim Moon-hak
 Jo Jung-chi as Na Mu-myeong

Extended
 Kim Ji-sung as Choi Dal-soon
 Choi Ban-ya as Ma-tan's mother
 Lee So-hee as Mo Hae-young

Special appearance
 Yoon Park as Manager Bae Soo-jin
 WJSN Chocome as themselves

Original soundtrack

Part 1

Part 2

Part 3

Part 4

Part 5

Ratings

References

External links
  
 
 
 

Korean-language television shows
ENA television dramas
Television series by Pan Entertainment
Television shows based on South Korean webtoons
South Korean workplace television series
South Korean comedy television series
2022 South Korean television series debuts
2022 South Korean television series endings